Dmytro Strelkovskyy (born 5 March 1995) is a Ukrainian footballer who plays as a forward for Amathus Ayiou Tychona.

References

External links
Dmytro Strelkovskyy at Soccerway
Dmytro Strelkovskyy at Football Database
Dmytro Strelkovskyy at World Football Profile

1995 births
Living people
Ukrainian footballers
Association football forwards
AEZ Zakakiou players
Ukrainian expatriate footballers
Expatriate footballers in Cyprus
Ukrainian expatriate sportspeople in Cyprus
Cypriot First Division players
Cypriot Second Division players